Saint Stephen's Episcopal School is a private college preparatory school affiliated with the Episcopal Church. The school is accredited by the Florida Council of Independent Schools. It is located in Bradenton, Florida. Founded in 1970, SSES has 650 students in grades Pre-K3 through 12.

Educational institutions established in 1970
Private high schools in Florida
Private middle schools in Florida
Private elementary schools in Florida
Episcopal schools in the United States
Bradenton, Florida